Bob Atkinson (27 April 1930 – 13 April 2017) was an Australian rules footballer who played with St Kilda and South Melbourne in the Victorian Football League (VFL).

Football
Recruited from Port Melbourne Football Club in 1952, he played his first match for the St Kilda First XVIII in round 14, against Melbourne, on 26 July 1952.

He transferred to South Melbourne in 1953.

Notes

References

External links 

2017 deaths
1930 births
Australian rules footballers from Victoria (Australia)
St Kilda Football Club players
Sydney Swans players
Port Melbourne Football Club players